Kela Alon  is an Israeli settlement organized as a community settlement, in the Golan Heights.

The international community considers Israeli settlements in the Golan Heights illegal under international law, but the Israeli government disputes this. Ramat Trump is a planned community located near Kela Alon.

History
Until depopulation in  1967, the place was occupied by the Syrian village of Qanaabé (Kana'beh), which had approximately 480 inhabitants.  The area was settled by Israelis in 1981 and is initially Nahal settlement. However, the proximity of military areas and the presence of land mines caused it to be abandoned in 1988. The modern settlement was established in 1991 and was originally called "Bruchim". The first settlers were  immigrants from the 1990s from the Soviet Union. The current name was adopted in 1997. A new neighborhood was built in 2003, also known as Mazok Orvim (Hebrew: מצוק עורבים).

See also
Northern District (Israel)
Israeli-occupied territories

References

 Israeli settlement in Golan named after US president

Israeli settlements in the Golan Heights
Golan Regional Council
Populated places in Northern District (Israel)
Populated places established in 1981
Populated places established in 1991
1981 establishments in the Israeli Military Governorate
Community settlements
Russian-Jewish culture in Israel